Lord Morgan may refer to:
 Kenneth O. Morgan, Welsh historian and author
 Lord Morgan (musician), Ghanaian dancehall and afrobeats musician